"Burning Feeling" is a song by Australian rock-pop band Noiseworks. It was released in March 1988 as the fifth and final single from their first studio album, Noiseworks (1987) and peaked at number 60 on the Australian Kent Music Report.

Track listing
7" (65147476)

 Track 2 recorded on 3 June 1987 at Selina's Sydney

Charts

External links
 https://www.discogs.com/Noiseworks-Burning-Feeling/release/3486929

References

Noiseworks songs
1987 songs
1988 singles
CBS Records singles
Songs written by Jon Stevens
Song recordings produced by Mark Opitz